is a 1997 Japanese film directed by Rokuro Mochizuki.

Cast 
Yoshio Harada - Noriyuki Kunihiro
Reiko Kataoka - Asako Hino
Show Aikawa - Naoto Tanigawa
Kazuki Kitamura - Hideyuki Sakata 
Ryushi Mizukami - Hanamura
Hiroyuki Tsunekawa - Satoshi Fujima
Ryuji Yamamoto - Hiroshi Fujima
Yoshiaki Fujita - Kinjo
Ei Kawakami - Yoshida
Toshihiro Kinomoto - Aoki
Seiroku Nakazawa - Nagashima
Masai Ikenaga - Kizaki
Eiji Minakata - Kanigawa
Hajime Yamazaki - Driving School Teacher
Eiji Okuda - Myojin

Awards and nominations
19th Yokohama Film Festival
 Won: Best Film
 Won: Best Director - Rokuro Mochizuki
 Won: Best Actor - Yoshio Harada
 Won: Best Supporting Actress - Reiko Kataoka

References

External links 

 鬼火(1996) at allcinema (in Japanese)
 鬼火 at KINENOTE (in Japanese)

1997 films
Films directed by Rokuro Mochizuki
1990s Japanese-language films
Yakuza films
1990s Japanese films